Malcolm Spencer (5 November 1931 – 20 January 1990) was an Australian rugby league footballer who played as a  in the 1950s. He played for South Sydney in the New South Wales Rugby League (NSWRL) competition during the club's second golden era where they won 5 premierships from 7 grand final appearances between 1949 and 1955.  Spencer also had stints with Eastern Suburbs and Newtown.

Playing career
Spencer made his first grade debut for South Sydney in 1952.  At the end of the season, Souths reached their 4th grand final in a row against Western Suburbs.  Souths would lose the grand final 22–12 with Spencer playing at centre.  The match was remembered due to its controversy with claims the referee George Bishop had put a big wager on Wests winning the game.  Souths claimed that they were denied two fair tries and Wests had scored one try off a blatant knock on.

In 1953, Spencer joined South Sydney's rivals Eastern Suburbs.  In 1954, Spencer captain coached Bellingen in the country rugby league competition.

Spencer returned to South Sydney in 1955.  Halfway through the season, Souths were given next to no chance of retaining their premiership but the club then managed to win 9 matches in a row including 2 finals games to reach the 1955 NSWRL Grand Final against minor premiers Newtown.  Newtown went into the match as favorites due to Souths being without fullback Clive Churchill and other star players.  Spencer played at centre in the match as South Sydney defeated Newtown 12–11 to claim their 16th premiership.

In 1957, Spencer played one final season in first grade for Newtown before retiring

Spencer died at his home in Maroubra, New South Wales following a short illness on 20 January 1990. He was 58 years of age.

References

1931 births
1990 deaths
Australian rugby league players
South Sydney Rabbitohs players
Sydney Roosters players
Newtown Jets players
Rugby league centres